HMS Petersfield (ex-Portmadoc) was a Hunt-class minesweeper of the Aberdare sub-class built for the Royal Navy during World War I. She was not finished in time to participate in the First World War. Re-commissioned at Hong Kong on 23 February 1925 for service on the China Station as an admiral's yacht. She was wrecked on 11 November 1931 off Tung Yung Island, with the C-in-C China Station Admiral Sir Howard Kelly embarked. Two courts martial following her loss resulted in severe reprimands for her Captain, Commander Douglas C. Lang and Navigating Lieutenant, Geoffrey A. H. Pratt, though an imperious meddling throughout the unfolding disaster brought ignominy upon Admiral Kelly, as well.

Design and description
The Aberdare sub-class were enlarged versions of the original Hunt-class ships with a more powerful armament. The ships displaced  at normal load. The ships' complement consisted of 74 officers and ratings.

The ships had two vertical triple-expansion steam engines, each driving one shaft, using steam provided by two Yarrow boilers.

The Aberdare sub-class was armed with a quick-firing (QF)  gun forward of the bridge and a QF twelve-pounder (76.2 mm) anti-aircraft gun aft. Some ships were fitted with six- or three-pounder guns in lieu of the twelve-pounder.

First commander

Her first commander was Stuart Bonham Carter, who went on to become an admiral.

Loss
The minesweeper with the Commander-in-Chief of the China Station, Vice-Admiral Sir William Kelly aboard, ran ashore on the night of Wednesday 11 November 1931 on the north side of Tungyung Island while on a passage from Shanghai to Fuzhou; it was a total loss. The SS Derflinger and the Canadian Pacific liner RMS Empress of Asia went to the Petersfields assistance, and the county-class cruisers Suffolk and Cornwall proceeded rapidly to the scene. The north-east monsoon was understood to have been raging at the time. The Petersfield was a tender to the cruiser Kent, of the Fifth Cruiser Squadron. Admiral Kelly and 73 officers and men on board were rescued by the Derflinger.

See also
Petersfield
Stuart Bonham Carter

Notes

References
 
 
 
 dreadnought project
 naval-history.net
 wrecksite
 LOSS ON CHINA STATION EVENING POST, VOLUME CXII, ISSUE 118, 14 NOVEMBER 1931

 

Hunt-class minesweepers (1916)
Royal Navy ship names
1919 ships
Petersfield
Maritime incidents in 1931
Shipwrecks of China